General elections were held in Guatemala on 3 November 1985, with a second round of the presidential elections taking place on 8 December. The presidential election resulted in a victory for Vinicio Cerezo, who had received $650,000 towards his campaign from media owner Remigio Ángel González. The Congressional elections resulted in a victory for Cerezo's Guatemalan Christian Democracy, which won 51 of the 100 seats. Voter turnout was 69.3%.

Results

President

Congress

References

Bibliography
Villagrán Kramer, Francisco. Biografía política de Guatemala: años de guerra y años de paz. FLACSO-Guatemala, 2004.
Political handbook of the world 1978. New York, 1979.

Elections in Guatemala
General
Guatemala
Presidential elections in Guatemala